Šarūnas Bartas (born 16 August 1964) is a Lithuanian film director. One of the most prominent Lithuanian film directors internationally from the late 20th century. His 2015 film Peace to Us in Our Dreams was screened in the Directors' Fortnight section at the 2015 Cannes Film Festival. His film In the Dusk was part of the official selection of the 2020 Cannes Film Festival.

Filmography

 Tofolaria (1986, short film)
 In the Memory of a Day Gone By (Praėjusios dienos atminimui) (1990, documentary)
 Three Days (Trys dienos) (1991)
 The Corridor (Koridorius) (1995)
 Few of Us (Mūsų nedaug) (1996)
 The House (Namai) (1997)
 Freedom (Laisvė) (2000)
 "Children Lose Nothing" in Visions of Europe (2004)
 Seven Invisible Men (Septyni nematomi žmonės) (2005)
 Eastern Drift (Eurazijos aborigenas) (2010)
 Peace to Us in Our Dreams (Ramybė mūsų sapnuose) (2015)
 Frost (2017)
 In the Dusk (Sutemose) (2019)

Awards
 Audience Award in International Documentary Film Festival Amsterdam, 1990 for "Praėjusios dienos atminimui"
 FIPRESCI Prize - Honorable Mention and Prize of the Ecumenical Jury - Special Mention in Berlin International Film Festival, 1992 for "Trys dienos"
FIPRESCI Prize in Viennale, 1995 for "Koridorius"
 C.I.C.A.E. Award in Torino International Festival of Young Cinema, 1995 for "Koridorius"
'CinemAvvenire' Award (Best Film on the Relationship Man-Nature) in Venice Film Festival, 2000 for "Freedom"

References

Further reading
 Šarūnas Bartas: The Philosopher of Lithuanian Cinema & Šarūnas Bartas' Films, Renata Šukaitytė, in: Lithuanian Cinema: Special Edition for Lithuanian Film Days in Poland 2015, Auksė Kancerevičiūtė [ed.]. Vilnius: Lithuanian Film Centre, 2015. .

External links

1964 births
Living people
Lithuanian film directors
Recipients of the Lithuanian National Prize
People from Šiauliai